"Cutty Sark" is a novella about the sailing ship Cutty Sark by the Soviet writer and paleontologist Ivan Yefremov. It was written in 1942–1943 and first published in the USSR in 1944.

Intrigued by the history of the Cutty Sark, Yefremov produced a sketch about her, which ended with a beautiful version of dry-docking the legendary tea clipper in the United States. The story was translated into English and other languages. Yefremov's story may have influenced the preservation of the Cutty Sark, which was reconstructed and dry-docked in Greenwich, London, 1954.

The feedback from English-speaking readers forced Yefremov to "upgrade" the storyline with some new facts from clipper's life.

The story popularized the Cutty Sark in the USSR and Russia.

References

External links
  Cutty Sark in Esperanto
  Cutty Sark (first version) // Krasnoflotets (Leningrad), 1944, №5, pp. 27–35. 
  Cutty Sark (revised version), published since 1958 (zip, 42,4 KB)

Short stories by Ivan Yefremov
1944 short stories
Works originally published in Russian magazines